Dilan and Dillan may refer to:

Given name

Female
 Dilan Ağgül (born 1998), Turkish-German women's footballer
 Dilan Çiçek Deniz (born 1995), Turkish actress, model and beauty pageant titleholder
 Dilan Deniz Gökçek (born 1976), Turkish female football official
 Dilan Gwyn (born 1987), Swedish actress
 Dilan Yeşim Taşkın (born 2001), Austrian-Turkish footballer
 Dilan Yeşilgöz-Zegerius (born 1977), Dutch politician

Male
 Dilan Chandima (born 1990), Sinhalese cricketer
 Dilan Fernando (born 1985), Italian-Sinhalese cricketer
 Dilan Jay, Sri Lankan-American actor
 Dilan Jayalath (born 1997), Sinhalese cricketer
 Dilan Jayawardane (born 1982), Sinhalese engineer
 Dilan Markanday (born 2001), English footballer
 Dilan Ortiz (born 2000), Colombian football player
 Dilan Perera (born 1962), Sinhalese politician
 Dilan Prašović (born 1994), Montenegrin professional boxer
 Dilan Qela (born 1998), Kosovo Albanian footballer
 Dilan Ramanayake (born 1980), Sri Lankan former cricketer
 Dilan Raj (born 1972), Sri Lankan cricket player and coach
 Dilan Suraweera (born 1997), Sinhalese cricketer
 Dilan Woutersz (born 1977), Sinhalese cricketer 
 Dilan Zúñiga (born 1996), Chilean footballer
 Dillan Ismail (born 1992), Swedish footballer

Surname
 Erik Martin Dilan, American politician and New York City Council member
 Martin Malave Dilan, American politician and New York City Council member
 Muhamad Salih Dilan, Kurdish poet
 Şehnaz Dilan (born 1960), Turkish female footballer, model, actress and singer

Other
 Dilan 1990, an Indonesian film
 Dilan 1991, an Indonesian film

See also
 Đilan, the old name for Gjilan (Serbian: Gnjilane)
 Dylan (disambiguation)